High Pavement Chapel is a redundant church building in Nottingham, Nottinghamshire, England. It is now the Pitcher and Piano public house and is Grade II listed. It was built as, and for most of its existence operated as, a Unitarian place of worship.

History
By August 1662, under the Act of Uniformity, two Nottingham ministers, John Whitlock and William Reynolds, had been deprived of their living at St Mary's Church, Nottingham and a third, John Barret, of his at St Peter's; the three men left town to comply with the Five Mile Act 1665. However, they continued to preach in the area, including houses in Nottingham's Bridlesmith Gate and Middle Pavement. This led to the foundation of a permanent chapel in High Pavement in 1690.

By 1735 the congregation had established itself as liberal (in the tradition of English Presbyterianism) and in 1802 as Unitarian. In 1758 the appointment of a new junior minister,  Isaac Smithson, caused a schism. The senior minister withdrew to a new chapel in nearby Halifax Place. This schism lasted until 1775 when the two congregations merged. The original chapel was considerably rebuilt in 1805.

In 1864 the congregation opened a daughter church, Christ Church, Peas Hill. This survived until 1932.

The current building was opened in 1876, built to a design of the architect Stuart Colman, of Bristol. It was used as a place of worship for Unitarians until 1982. It was then converted into the Nottingham Lace Museum, but this venture proved financially unviable. The building was then converted to its current use, as a Pitcher and Piano public house. The current congregation, Nottingham Unitarians, affiliated with the General Assembly of Unitarian and Free Christian Churches, are now based nearby at 3 Plumptre Street, Nottingham NG1 1JL, a former lace factory where items of lace were finished.

Stained glass
 East window 1904, by Morris & Co., to designs by Philip Burne-Jones
 North aisle war memorial window, 1925, by Kempe & Co
 Sunday School memorial window, 1906, by Henry Holiday
 North transept north window 1890, by H Enfield

Ministers

John Whitlock, M.A. 1662–1708
William Reynolds, M.A. 1662–1698
John Barret, B.A. 1662–1713
John Whitlock junior 1689–1723
John Hardy 1714–1727
Nathaniel Whitlock 1729–1739 
Obadiah Hughes 1728–1735
Samuel Eaton, 0.0.1737–1759 
Joseph Evans 1754–1758
Isaac Smithson 1758–1769
John Milne 1759–1772
Thomas Brushaw 1769–1772
John Simpson 1772–1777
George Walker, F.R.S. 1774–1798
Nathaniel Philipps, D. D. 1778–1785 
Nicholas Clayton, LL.D. 1785–1795
William Walters 1794–1806
Robert Kell 1799–1801
James Tayler 1802–1831
John Grundy 1806–1811
William Pitt Scargill 1811
Richard Fry 1812–1813
Joseph Hutton, LL.D. 1813–1816
Henry Turner 1817–1822
Benjamin Carpenter 1822·1860
William Blazeby, B.A. 1859–1860
Peter William Clayden 1860–1868
Richard Acland Armstrong, B.A. 1869–1884
James Harwood, B.A. 1884–1892
William Edward Addis, M.A. 1892–1899
Joseph Morgan Lloyd Thomas 1900–1912 
John Charles Ballantyne, M. A. 1913–1918
Simon Jones, B.A. 1918–1934
James Arnold Williams, B.A., B.D. 1934–1946
Charles Gordon Bolam, B.A., B.D., M.A. 1946–

Organists
Henry Farmer 1839 – 1879
William Wright 1879 – 1894 (later organist of St Leodegarius Church, Basford, then Christ Church, Cinderhill)
Charles Lymn 1894 – 1914 – ????
H. Freestone ca. 1916
Charles Edward Blyton Dobson 1920 – 1925
Wilfred Davies ca. 1960s

References in literature
The church is mentioned in Sons and Lovers by D.H. Lawrence, chapter 15. 
Then, happening to go into the Unitarian Church one Sunday evening, when they stood up to sing the second hymn he saw her before him. The light glistened on her lower lip as she sang. She looked as if she had got something, at any rate: some hope in heaven, if not in earth. Her comfort and her life seemed in the after-world. A warm, strong feeling for her came up. She seemed to yearn, as she sang, for the mystery and comfort. He put his hope in her. He longed for the sermon to be over, to speak to her. The throng carried her out just before him.

References

An Itinerary of Nottingham, J. Holland Walker, 1927.
Allens Illustrated Guide to Nottingham, J. Potter Briscoe, 1888.

Nottingham High Pavement
Nottingham, High Pavement Chapel
Churches completed in 1876
19th-century churches in the United Kingdom
Presbyterian churches in England
Former Presbyterian churches
Former churches in Nottinghamshire
Unitarian chapels in England
Pubs in Nottingham
Grade II listed pubs in Nottinghamshire